Redivivus is Winters Bane third album, released on April 11, 2006 by DCA Recordings.

Track listing
"Seal the Light" - 4:53
"Spark to Flame" - 5:29
"The World" - 4:19
"Dead Faith" - 4:24
"Catching the Sun" - 4:50
"Remember to Forget" - 4:17
"Burning Bridges" - 4:32
"Waves of Fury" - 4:39
"Despise the Lie" - 3:32

European Bonus Tracks
10. "Catching the Sun" - 4:36
11. "Remember to Forget" - 4:18
12. "Seal the Light" - 4:37
13. "Furies" - 4:44

These songs are demo versions taken from "Demo 2003".

Credits
Alex Koch - Vocals
Lou St. Paul - Guitar/Bass
Mark Cross - Drums

References

2006 albums
Winter's Bane albums
Albums produced by Chris Tsangarides